The First Church of Christ and the Ancient Burying Ground (also known as Center Church: First Church of Christ in Hartford or First Church in Hartford) is a historic church and cemetery at 60 Gold Street in Hartford, Connecticut. It is the oldest church congregation in Hartford, founded in 1636 by Thomas Hooker.  The present building, the congregation's fourth, was built in 1807, and was listed on the National Register of Historic Places in 1972.  The adjacent cemetery, formally set apart in 1640, was the city's sole cemetery until 1803.

Description

The First Church of Christ, located in downtown Hartford at the corner of Main and Gold Streets, is a prominent local example of Classical Revival architecture. Daniel Wadsworth probably designed it, loosely following the example of architect James Gibbs's church of Saint Martin in the Fields in London. A monumental two-story temple portico with modified Ionic columns forms the entrance to the brick structure, and is surmounted by a three-stage tower that repeats the columns at an increasingly diminished scale at each major level.  There are three entrances on the main facade, each topped by a half-round fanlight window. The Ancient Burying Ground extends west and north of the church and features a variety of stones made from many different carvers out of different materials such as brownstone, schist, slate and marble.

History
The Hartford congregation was founded as a Reformed congregation in 1636 with Thomas Hooker serving as the first pastor. The members of the congregation had previously migrated from England to Massachusetts and spent four years there before leaving Massachusetts after a dispute with the Puritan leaders of the Massachusetts Bay Colony. The old burial ground adjacent to the building in Hartford dates to around 1640 with the oldest surviving tombstone in the yard dating from 1648. The current church meeting house dates to 1807 and is the fourth meeting house to serve as a place of worship for the congregation. The church meeting house and cemetery were added to the National Register of Historic Places in 1972. The congregation is currently affiliated with the United Church of Christ (UCC).

Notable members and persons buried in the burying ground
Thomas Hooker, Founder of Connecticut
William Leete, Governor of Connecticut
Joseph Talcott, Governor of Connecticut
Jeremiah Wadsworth, United States House of Representatives
Thomas Welles, Governor of Connecticut
George Wyllys, Governor of Connecticut

Gallery

See also
Founders of Hartford, Connecticut
National Register of Historic Places in Hartford, Connecticut

References

External links

Official church website
Historical catalogue of the First Church in Hartford. 1633-1885 (Pub. by the Church, Hartford: 1885)
Hartford’s Ancient Burying Ground

1636 establishments in Connecticut
1640 establishments in Connecticut
19th-century churches in the United States
Churches completed in 1807
Churches in Hartford, Connecticut
Churches on the National Register of Historic Places in Connecticut
Cemeteries in Hartford County, Connecticut
National Register of Historic Places in Hartford, Connecticut
Neoclassical architecture in Connecticut
United Church of Christ churches in Connecticut
Neoclassical church buildings in the United States